Events from the year 1977 in Iran.

Incumbents
 Shah: Mohammad Reza Pahlavi 
 Prime Minister: Amir-Abbas Hoveida (starting August 7), Jamshid Amouzegar (until August 7)

Events
 19 December – The Bob–Tangol earthquake strikes Kerman province, killing 584–665 people and causing local destruction.

Births

 May – Maryam Mirzakhani.

See also
 Years in Iraq
 Years in Afghanistan

References

 
Iran
Years of the 20th century in Iran
1970s in Iran
Iran